Hemerocoetes artus is a duckbill fish of the genus Hemerocoetes, found only around the subantarctic islands south of New Zealand at depths of between 100 and 600 m.  Their length is between 10 and 25 cm.

References

 
 
 Tony Ayling & Geoffrey Cox, Collins Guide to the Sea Fishes of New Zealand,  (William Collins Publishers Ltd, Auckland, New Zealand 1982) 

Percophidae
Taxa named by Joseph S. Nelson
Fish described in 1979